King City (variant: Kings City) is a city in Monterey County, California, United States. It lies along U.S. Route 101 in the Salinas Valley of California's Central Coast. King City is a member of the Association of Monterey Bay Area Governments. The population was 13,332 at the 2020 census, up from 12,874 in 2010.

History
The first European land exploration of Alta California, Don Gaspar de Portolá's Spanish expedition, camped on the Salinas River just south of today's King City on September 26, 1769, having followed the route of today's Jolon Road from the south. The land they camped on would later become part of King City.

The Dutton Hotel, Stagecoach Station, was located on Jolon Road in King City. What remains are ruins of an adobe inn that was established in 1849. The Dutton Hotel was a major stagecoach stop on El Camino Real in the late 1880s. The landmark was listed on the National Register of Historic Places on October 14, 1971.

King City was originally known as "Kings City" for its founder, Charles King. In 1884 Charles King acquired  of the Mexican land grant Rancho San Lorenzo, originally given to Mariano and Feliciano Soberanes in the early 1840s during Mexican rule of California. King began growing  of wheat. In an effort to get his crop to market, King allowed the Southern Pacific Railroad to lay tracks across King Ranch land. The terminus was a station known as King's.

In 1886, the Southern Pacific Railroad completed service to King City to serve the farms and ranches in the south Salinas Valley and to transport the goods to San Francisco and Los Angeles.

It was originally called "Hog Town" due to the passel of semi-wild hogs roaming the stubble fields. King wanted to name the town "Vanderhurst", after local merchant William Vanderhurst, but was outvoted and it was named for him. The city became known as Kings', then the City of King, and later simply King City.

The King City post office first opened in 1887. Edwards S. Brown, brother-in-law of C.H. King was appointed Postmaster. King City incorporated under the name "City of King" in 1911.

J. Ernst Steinbeck, father of the novelist John Steinbeck, claimed to have been the first permanent resident of King City. Steinbeck was certainly among the first settlers. He was the first agent for the Southern Pacific Milling Company, which built an early warehouse and flour mill alongside the railroad tracks running through town. The mill was built by R. M. Shackelford, an early California settler and businessman who owned sheep pasturage next to that of Charles King.

Agriculture has always played a role in King City history. Between 1910 and 1930, the city became famous for growing pink beans. King City Pinks were sold around the country, helped along by additional demand during World War I.

The Robert Stanton Auditorium, built in 1939 as a WPA Depression project, is an example of Art Moderne style, with elliptical rounded corners, Doric-style columns, an expansive curved stairway leading to recessed oak and glass double doors, and a bas-relief triptych by artist Jo Mora, above doors that depict notable multi-cultural scenes of historic importance. Mora's art is incorporated into the building's design both inside and out. In 1991, it was listed on the National Register of Historic Places.

Geography
It lies between Greenfield  to the northwest and San Lucas  to the southeast, all of them along U.S. Route 101. The Salinas River flows on the west side of the city; due to its sandy bed, portions of the river sometimes flow underground, especially during the summer months.

Climate
King City has a semi-arid climate (BSk), although bordering on a Mediterranean climate (Csb), with very warm, mostly dry summers and cool, wet winters.

There are an average of 40 days with measurable precipitation. Although snow often falls in the winter in the Santa Lucia mountains west of the city, it is quite rare in the Salinas Valley; however,  fell in January 1957 and  fell in December 1954.
The low humidity in the area contributes to freezing temperatures at night, and intense temperatures during daylight.

Transportation
King City is served by Amtrak Thruway Motorcoach, as the passenger train that passes through the community does not stop. In 2018, King City was denied a $21 million TIRCP grant to build a multimodal transportation center which would provide connections to Amtrak between Paso Robles and Salinas. City officials have said they will apply again in the future. A small $1.5 million grant was approved by the state government the following year, providing funds to design the Amtrak platform.

Demographics

2010
At the 2010 census King City had a population of 12,874. The racial makeup of King City was 6,173 (47.9%) White, 150 (1.2%) African American, 347 (2.7%) Native American, 172 (1.3%) Asian, 8 (0.1%), Pacific Islander, 5,451 (42.3%) from other races, and 573 (4.5%) from two or more races. Hispanic or Latino of any race were 11,266 persons (87.5%).

The census reported that 12,815 people (99.5% of the population) lived in households, no one lived in non-institutionalized group quarters and 59 (0.5%) were institutionalized.

There were 3,008 households, 1,852 (61.6%) had children under the age of 18 living in them, 1,823 (60.6%) were opposite-sex married couples living together, 386 (12.8%) had a female householder with no husband present, 272 (9.0%) had a male householder with no wife present.  There were 188 (6.3%) unmarried opposite-sex partnerships, and 21 (0.7%) same-sex married couples or partnerships. 412 households (13.7%) were one person and 186 (6.2%) had someone living alone who was 65 or older. The average household size was 4.26.  There were 2,481 families (82.5% of households); the average family size was 4.47.

The age distribution was 4,374 people (34.0%) under the age of 18, 1,819 people (14.1%) aged 18 to 24, 3,937 people (30.6%) aged 25 to 44, 1,984 people (15.4%) aged 45 to 64, and 760 people (5.9%) who were 65 or older.  The median age was 25.9 years. For every 100 females, there were 115.7 males.  For every 100 females age 18 and over, there were 119.3 males.

There were 3,218 housing units at an average density of 807.8 per square mile, of the occupied units 1,394 (46.3%) were owner-occupied and 1,614 (53.7%) were rented. The homeowner vacancy rate was 3.2%; the rental vacancy rate was 3.4%.  5,586 people (43.4% of the population) lived in owner-occupied housing units and 7,229 people (56.2%) lived in rental housing units.

2000
At the 2000 census there were 11,094 people in 2,736 households, including 2,251 families, in the city. The racial makeup of the city was 42.09% White, 0.59% Black or African American, 1.05% Native American, 1.23% Asian, 0.14% Pacific Islander, 50.46% from other races, and 4.46% from two or more races.  80.42% of the population were Hispanic or Latino of any race.
Of the 2,736 households 54.6% had children under the age of 18 living with them, 62.2% were married couples living together, 12.4% had a female householder with no husband present, and 17.7% were non-families. 13.5% of households were one person and 6.0% were one person aged 65 or older.  The average household size was 4.03 and the average family size was 4.28.

The age distribution was 35.7% under the age of 18, 13.7% from 18 to 24, 31.2% from 25 to 44, 13.3% from 45 to 64, and 6.2% 65 or older.  The median age was 25 years. For every 100 females, there were 115.8 males.  For every 100 females age 18 and over, there were 119.6 males.

The median annual income for a household in the city was $34,398 and the median annual income for a family was $33,750. Males had a median annual income of $27,377 versus $25,286 for females. The per capita annual income for the city was $11,685.  About 16.9% of families and 20.8% of the population were below the poverty line, including 23.5% of those under age 18 and 17.1% of those age 65 or over.

Media

Radio and television
Local radio stations include KEXA-FM – 93.9, KRKC-AM – 1490, 102 KRKC-FM, and KDON-FM 102.5. Television service for the community comes from the Monterey–Salinas–Santa Cruz designated market area (DMA).

Newspapers
Local newspapers include the Gannett-owned Salinas Californian and the town's own weekly, The King City Rustler.

The Rustler was founded in 1901 by Fred Vivian, who reportedly went into a local barber shop, sold subscriptions to all the customers and then passed around a hat for them to suggest names for the newspaper. "The Rustler" was the one he drew out.

Vivian was later succeeded as publisher by his grandson Harry Casey, who was called home to King City in 1952 to take over management of the newspaper by his aunt Ruth Steglich after the death of her husband, then-publisher Bill Steglich. He served as co-publisher until Ruth Steglich's death and publisher until declining health forced him to sell The Rustler and three other regional weeklies to News Media, Inc. in 1995.

Casey, whose sons Rich and Bill still operate Casey Printing in King City, died in 1998. Both he and Vivian are members of the California Newspaper Hall of Fame.

In popular culture
The town features prominently in the song "Queen of King City", on the Red Meat album We Never Close.

King City is mentioned repeatedly in John Steinbeck's novel East of Eden. The book is principally set in the surrounding Salinas Valley.

King City is revealed to be the home town of The Man in the Tan Jacket in the novel Welcome to Night Vale, and the town is a major part of the plot.

The 1972 film The Candidate was shot in King City.

Notable people
Eldon Dedini, cartoonist
Jim Mankins (1944-2004), King City High School running back who played for Oklahoma and Florida State
George Taylor Morris (1947–2009), radio host

See also

Coastal California
List of school districts in Monterey County, California
List of tourist attractions in Monterey County, California
Mee Memorial Hospital

References

External links

 

1911 establishments in California
Cities in Monterey County, California
Incorporated cities and towns in California
Populated places established in 1911
Salinas Valley